Wei (Hanzi: 魏; pinyin: Wèi < Middle Chinese: *ŋjweiC < Eastern Han Chinese: *ŋuiC) (220–266), known as Cao Wei or Former Wei in historiography, was a dynastic state of China and one of the three major states that competed for supremacy over China in the Three Kingdoms period. With its capital initially located at Xuchang, and thereafter Luoyang, the state was established by Cao Pi (Emperor Wen) in 220, based upon the foundations laid by his father, Cao Cao, towards the end of the Eastern Han dynasty. The name "Wei" first became associated with Cao Cao when he was named the Duke of Wei by the Eastern Han government in 213, and became the name of the state when Cao Pi proclaimed himself emperor in 220. Historians often add the prefix "Cao" to distinguish it from other Chinese states known as "Wei". The authority of the ruling Cao family dramatically weakened in the aftermath of the deposing and execution of Cao Shuang and his siblings, the former being one of the regents for the third Cao Wei emperor, Cao Fang, with state authority gradually falling into the hands of Sima Yi, another Cao Wei regent, and his family, from 249 onwards. The last Wei emperors would remain largely as puppet rulers under the control of the Simas until Sima Yi's grandson, Sima Yan, forced the last Wei ruler, Cao Huan (Emperor Yuan), to abdicate the throne and established the Western Jin dynasty.

History

Beginnings and founding

Towards the end of the Eastern Han dynasty, northern China came under the control of Cao Cao, the chancellor to the last Han ruler, Emperor Xian. In 213, Emperor Xian granted Cao Cao the title of "Duke of Wei" (魏公) and gave him ten cities as his dukedom. The area was named "Wei". At that time, the southern part of China was divided into two areas controlled by two other warlords, Liu Bei and Sun Quan. In 216, Emperor Xian promoted Cao Cao to the status of a vassal king – "King of Wei (魏王)" – and granted him more territories.

Cao Cao died on 15 March 220 and his vassal king title was inherited by his son Cao Pi. Later that year, on 11 December, Cao Pi forced Emperor Xian to abdicate in his favour and took over the throne, establishing the state of Wei. However, Liu Bei immediately contested Cao Pi's claim to the Han throne and declared himself "Emperor of Han" a year later. Sun Quan was nominally a vassal king under Wei, but he declared independence in 222 and eventually proclaimed himself "Emperor of Wu" in 229.

To distinguish the state from other historical Chinese states of the same name, historians have added a relevant character to the state's original name: the state that called itself "Wei" (魏) is also known as "Cao Wei" (曹魏)

Reigns of Cao Pi and Cao Rui
Cao Pi ruled for six years until his death in 226 and was succeeded by his son, Cao Rui, who ruled until his death in 239. Throughout the reigns of Cao Pi and Cao Rui, Wei had been fighting numerous wars with its two rival states – Shu and Wu.

Between 228 and 234, Zhuge Liang, the Shu chancellor and regent, led a series of five military campaigns to attack Wei's western borders (within present-day Gansu and Shaanxi), with the aim of conquering Chang'an, a strategic city which lay on the road to the Wei capital, Luoyang. The Shu invasions were repelled by the Wei armies led by the generals Cao Zhen, Sima Yi, Zhang He and others; Shu did not make any significant gains in the expeditions.

On its southern and eastern borders, Wei engaged Wu in a series of armed conflicts throughout the 220s and 230s, including the battles of Dongkou (222–223), Jiangling (223) and Shiting (228). However, most of the battles resulted in stalemate and neither side managed to significantly expand its territory.

Sima Yi's Liaodong Campaign

After Guanqiu Jian failed to subjugate the Gongsun clan of the Liaodong Commandery, it was Sima Yi who, in June 238, as the Grand Commandant (太尉), launched an invasion with 40,000 troops at the behest of Emperor Cao Rui against Liaodong, which at this point had been firmly rooted under Gongsun control for 4 decades. After a three-month long siege, involving some assistance from the Goguryeo Kingdom, Sima Yi managed to capture the capital city of Xiangping, resulting in the conquest of the commandery by late September of the same year.

Goguryeo–Wei Wars

Around that time, as the Korean kingdom Goguryeo consolidated its power, it proceeded to conquer the territories on the Korean peninsula which were under Chinese rule. Goguryeo initiated the Goguryeo–Wei Wars in 242, trying to cut off Chinese access to its territories in Korea by attempting to take a Chinese fort. However, Wei responded by invading and defeated Goguryeo. Hwando was destroyed in a reprisal raid by Wei forces in 244. The invasions sent its king fleeing, and broke the tributary relationships between Goguryeo and the other tribes of Korea that formed much of Goguryeo's economy. Although the king evaded capture and eventually settled in a new capital, Goguryeo was reduced to such insignificance that for half a century there was no mention of the state in Chinese historical texts.

Fall of Wei

In 249, during the reign of Cao Rui's successor, Cao Fang, the regent Sima Yi seized state power from his co-regent, Cao Shuang, in a coup. This event marked the collapse of imperial authority in Wei, as Cao Fang's role had been reduced to that of a puppet ruler while Sima Yi wielded state power firmly in his hands.  Wang Ling, a Wei general, tried to rebel against Sima Yi, but was swiftly dealt with, and took his own life. Sima Yi died on 7 September 251, passing on his authority to his eldest son, Sima Shi, who continued ruling as regent.

Sima Shi deposed Cao Fang in 254, on grounds of planning to stage a rebellion, and replaced him with Cao Mao. In response, Guanqiu Jian and Wen Qin staged a rebellion, but were crushed by Sima Shi in an event that nevertheless took a heavy toll on Sima Shi's health, having undergone eye surgery prior to the insurrection, causing him to die on 23 March 255, but not before handing his power and regency over to his younger brother, Sima Zhao.

In 258, Sima Zhao quelled Zhuge Dan's rebellion, marking an end to what are known as the Three Rebellions in Shouchun. In 260, Cao Mao attempted to seize back state power from Sima Zhao in a coup, but was killed by Cheng Ji, a military officer who was serving under Jia Chong, a subordinate to the Simas. After Cao Mao's death, Cao Huan was enthroned as the fifth ruler of Wei. However, Cao Huan was also a mere figurehead under Sima Zhao's control, much like his predecessor. 
In 263, Wei armies led by Zhong Hui and Deng Ai conquered Shu. Afterwards, Zhong Hui and former Shu general Jiang Wei grouped and plotted together in order to oust Sima Zhao from power, however, various Wei officials turned against them when it was found out that Jiang Wei had urged Zhong Hui to get rid of these officials before the planned coup. Sima Zhao himself received and finally accepted the nine bestowments and the title Duke of Jin in 263, and was further bestowed with the title King of Jin by Cao Huan in 264, but he died on 6 September 265, leaving the final step of usurpation up to his eldest son, Sima Yan.

On 4 February 266, Sima Zhao's son, Sima Yan, forced Cao Huan to abdicate in his favor, replacing Wei with the Jin dynasty on 8 February 266. Cao Huan himself was spared, though, and continued to live until 302, before dying.

Government
The system of government in Wei inherited many aspects from that of the Eastern Han dynasty. During his reign, Cao Pi established two separate government bodies – the Central Inspectorate (中書監) and the Mobile Imperial Secretariat (行尚書臺) — to reduce the authority of the Imperial Secretariat (尚書臺) and consolidate the power of the central government.

During this time, the minister Chen Qun developed the nine-rank system for civil service nomination, which was adopted by later dynasties until it was superseded by the imperial examination system in the Sui dynasty.

Cao Pi felt that the Han dynasty collapsed because the Governors (州牧) of the various provinces wielded too much power and fell outside the control of the central government. He reduced the role of a Governor to that of an Inspector (刺史), and permitted the Inspectors to administer only civil affairs in their respective provinces, while military affairs were handled by military personnel based in regional offices or in the capital.

Culture

The kaishu style of Chinese calligraphy was developed at some time between the late Eastern Han dynasty and the Cao Wei dynasty, as well as the Jian'an poetry style. The first known master of the former was Zhong Yao, an official of Wei, of the latter; Cao Cao's son, Cao Zhi.

Since the beginning of the Cao Wei dynasty, finding their roots in Cao Cao's administrative influences, intellectual constraints were relaxed, leading to the formation of new groups of intellectuals, such as the Seven Sages of the Bamboo Grove. These intellectual freedoms were overturned by the time of the Jin dynasty (it was Sima Yi himself who associated with the orthodox Confucianists, who despised these new intellectual groups, and therefore were more willing to offer their support to the Sima clan).

Ruling class
According to the Book of Wei, the Cao family descended from the Yellow Emperor through his grandson Zhuanxu. They were of the same lineage as Emperor Shun. Another account says that the Cao family descended from Emperor Shun. This account was attacked by Chiang Chi, who claimed that those with the family name "Tian" descended from Shun, but not those surnamed "Cao". He also claimed that "Gui" (媯) was Emperor Shun's family name.

List of territories

List of sovereigns

Cao Wei family tree

See also 
 Three Kingdoms
 Shu Han
 Eastern Wu

Notes

References

Further reading
de Crespigny, Rafe. "To Establish Peace: being the Chronicle of the Later Han dynasty for the years 201 to 220 AD as recorded in Chapters 64 to 69 of the Zizhi tongjian of Sima Guang". Volume 2.  Faculty of Asian Studies, The Australian National University, Canberra. 1996. .

 
220 establishments
266 disestablishments
Dynasties in Chinese history
Former countries in Chinese history
Former monarchies